The 88th Pennsylvania House of Representatives District is located in South Central Pennsylvania and has been represented since 2009 by Sheryl M. Delozier.

District profile
The 88th District is located in Cumberland County and includes the following areas: 

Hampden Township
Lower Allen Township (part)
Precinct 01 
Precinct 03 
Precinct 04
Precinct 05 
Precinct 06
Mechanicsburg
New Cumberland
Shiremanstown

Representatives

Recent election results

References

External links
District map from the United States Census Bureau
Pennsylvania House Legislative District Maps from the Pennsylvania Redistricting Commission.  
Population Data for District 88 from the Pennsylvania Redistricting Commission.

Government of Cumberland County, Pennsylvania
88